The General Electric Concert was a music series sponsored by General Electric and broadcast on the NBC Red Network beginning in 1931.

Featuring orchestral selections along with tenor Richard Crooks, the 30-minute program aired Sunday afternoon at 5:30pm in 1931–32. It moved to Sunday evenings at 9pm for the 1932–33 season.

As early as 1923, General Electric sponsored radio programs on WGY in Schenectady, New York. Walter Damrosch, a pioneer in the presentation of music on radio, conducted the orchestra for General Electric in the late 1920s and early 1930s on a program that was listed in newspapers as Damrosch's General Electric Concert.

References

See also
Music Appreciation Hour

1930s American radio programs
1931 radio programme debuts
American classical music radio programs
General Electric sponsorships
NBC radio programs